Great Britain competed at the 2022 World Aquatics Championships in Budapest, Hungary from 18 June to 3 July.

Medalists

Artistic swimming 

Great Britain entered 10 artistic swimmers.

Women

Diving

Great Britain entered 14 divers.

Men

Women

Mixed

Open water swimming

Great Britain entered 2 open water male swimmers

Men

Swimming

Great Britain entered 21 swimmers.
Men

Women

Mixed

 Legend: (*) = Swimmers who participated in the heat only.

References

Nations at the 2022 World Aquatics Championships
2022
World Aquatics Championships